Michael Mulder (born 10 January 2001) is a footballer who plays as a midfielder for ADO Den Haag. Born in the Netherlands, he is an Israel youth international.

Career

As a youth player, Mulder joined the youth academy of Dutch top flight side FC Utrecht. Before the second half of 2019–20, he joined the youth academy of Maccabi Petah Tikva in the Israeli second tier. In 2020, Mulder signed for Dutch club ADO Den Haag, where he made 27 league appearances. On 5 September 2021, he debuted for ADO during a 4–2 win over FC Eindhoven.

In 2022, Mulder signed for Beveren in Belgium.

References

External links
 

Living people
2001 births
Dutch people of Israeli descent
Dutch footballers
Israeli footballers
Association football midfielders
Israel youth international footballers
Eerste Divisie players
ADO Den Haag players
Dutch expatriate footballers
Israeli expatriate footballers
Dutch expatriate sportspeople in Belgium
Israeli expatriate sportspeople in Belgium
Expatriate footballers in Belgium
Dutch expatriate sportspeople in Israel
Expatriate footballers in Israel